Hannah Levien is an Australian actress and writer. Her first performance in a feature film was in the award-winning Australian revenge-thriller The Horseman playing teenage runaway Jesse Forteski. She is best known for roles as Calliope in Supernatural (U.S. TV series) and as Victoria in the Syfy fantasy series The Magicians, and as Janine in Freeform's thriller, Siren.

Early life
Levien grew up in Brisbane, Australia, where she attended drama school and began her acting career working in theatre. She completed her Masters in Screenwriting and Directing at the University of Sydney. She is a recipient of the prestigious Arts Queensland Professional Development Award that enabled her to study under American acting coach, Ivana Chubbuck in Los Angeles.

Career 
Levien began her foray into film with the acclaimed revenge-thriller, The Horseman, as runaway teenager, Jesse Forteski. Directed and written by Steven Kastrissios, the film went on to be shown at various film festivals around the world, including South by South West Film Festival, and won awards for best directing and best film at the Melbourne Underground Film Festival.

Levien was headhunted by a manager in 2011 to work in Los Angeles and was promptly cast in the film Children of Sorrow, alongside lead actor Bill Oberst Jr. Levein plays Ellen, a young woman who enters a cult to find answers into the mysterious disappearance of her sister. The film won multiple awards in the categories of Best Feature Film and Best Actor at the Sacramento Horror Film Festival and the Shockfest Film Festival in 2012 

After accepting roles in American shows Supernatural, The Magicians and Bates Motel, that are all filmed in Vancouver, Canada, Levien eventually made the decision to base herself between Los Angeles and Vancouver, where she could continue her exploration of sci-fi and fantasy genres.

Levien played the character of Victoria in The Magicians in the first and third seasons, and as character Janine in new show Siren, on Disney's Freeform channel. The show premiered on 29 March 2018. Siren is based on a story by Eric Wald and Dean White, who both serve as Executive Producers 

In 2021, Levien starred in TV Mini-Series "Brand New Cherry Flavor" on Netflix as the character Christine Woods.

References

External links 
 Official website
 Hannah Levien on IMDB

Australian actors
Year of birth missing (living people)
Living people
Australian expatriate actresses in the United States